Randall Briggs (born March 10, 1965) is an American professional stock car racing driver. He most notably ran full-time in the NASCAR Craftsman Truck Series in 2003. He also competed part-time for one year in both the NASCAR Busch Series (in 2004) and the ARCA Re/Max Series (in 2001).

Motorsports career results

NASCAR
(key) (Bold – Pole position awarded by qualifying time. Italics – Pole position earned by points standings or practice time. * – Most laps led.)

Busch Series

Craftsman Truck Series

ARCA Re/Max Series
(key) (Bold – Pole position awarded by qualifying time. Italics – Pole position earned by points standings or practice time. * – Most laps led.)

References

External links
 

1965 births
NASCAR drivers
Living people
Sportspeople from Kansas City, Kansas
Racing drivers from Kansas
ARCA Menards Series drivers